Georgina Lowe  is a British film and television producer, who has produced director Mike Leigh's films since 2009.

Among her TV Producer credits are the BBC miniseries Tipping the Velvet (2002), Fingersmith (2005), the ITV1 series Kingdom (2007–2009) and the Agatha Christie series Partners in Crime (2015).

In 1993, she started working with Mike Leigh and his producer Simon Channing Williams, as production manager on Naked, and since then she has been involved in the production of all Leigh's films.

She co-produced Topsy-Turvy (1999), All or Nothing (2002),  Vera Drake (2004) and Happy-Go-Lucky (2008).

She  produced Mike Leigh's Another Year (2010), A Running Jump (2012) and Mr. Turner (2014).

In 2011, Mike Leigh made her his partner in Thin Man Films, the production company he started with Channing Williams in 1988.

She has two daughters, Matilda and Sophie, and is married to the actor Sam Graham. Her brother in law is Phillip Schofield.

References

External links 
 
 Georgina Lowe biography at Thin Man Films
 

British television producers
British women television producers
Living people
1962 births